Rinnthal is a municipality in Südliche Weinstraße district, in Rhineland-Palatinate, western Germany.

During the Revolution of 1848, the town was the setting for a battle between Prussian army troops and Palatinate revolutionary forces who were resisting the invasion.

References

Municipalities in Rhineland-Palatinate
Palatinate Forest